

List of Miss Venezuela titleholders

Winners gallery

State/Region by winning the title 

Miss Venezuela titleholders
Miss Venezuela titleholders
Miss Venezuela titleholders